Anura Rohana (born 11 September 1973) is a Sri Lankan professional golfer. He plays primarily on the Professional Golf Tour of India, where he has won three times. He also plays on the Asian Tour and Asian Development Tour, primarily in events played in India. He won a silver medal at the 2002 Asian Games.

Amateur wins
1998 Malaysian Amateur Open
2000 Bangladesh Amateur Open
2001 Bangladesh Amateur Open, Pakistan Amateur Open
2002 Bangladesh Amateur Open

Professional wins (7)

Professional Golf Tour of India wins (6)

Other wins (1)
2009 Surya Nepal Masters

References

External links

Sri Lankan male golfers
Asian Tour golfers
Asian Games medalists in golf
Asian Games silver medalists for Sri Lanka
Golfers at the 2002 Asian Games
Medalists at the 2002 Asian Games
1973 births
Living people